Xenon Pictures is an American film production and distribution company which releases titles produced by African-American filmmakers for African-American audiences. The label has distribution deals with numerous prominent filmmakers, such as Melvin Van Peebles, Rudy Ray Moore, Jamaa Fanaka, Ralph Bakshi and Perry Henzell.

Company information 
Xenon was founded by S. Leigh Savidge in 1986 under the name of Xenon Entertainment with $17,000 in startup capital. Xenon has acquired and produced content that includes the work of Melvin Van Peebles (Sweet Sweetback’s Baadasssss Song) and Rudy Ray Moore (Dolemite), definitive biographies on Rosa Parks, Martin Luther King Jr. and Mahalia Jackson, films featuring hip-hop stars like Snoop Dogg, Tupac Shakur and Dr. Dre, and contemporary films from emerging directors such as Tim Story (Barbershop) and Mandel Holland (The Other Brother).

TelevisaUnivision Mexico home video distribution deal 
In 2002, Xenon signed a landmark deal with Mexican media powerhouse Televisa (now known as TelevisaUnivision Mexico) to develop and distribute its domestic video brand, Televisa Home Entertainment, in the United States. Working with programming such as classic television series, top-rated telenovelas, documentaries on major Latino stars, and theatrical features, Xenon helped  position TelevisaUnivision to be the dominant brand in the Latin/Spanish-language genre.

References

External links 
As of 18 March 2010, this article uses content from http://xenonpictures.com/xenon.html, which is licensed in a way that permits reuse under the Creative Commons Attribution-ShareAlike 3.0 Unported License, but not under the GFDL. All relevant terms must be followed.
 https://web.archive.org/web/20100213095221/http://www.xenonpictures.com/Press/index.html
 https://www.imdb.com/company/co0109042/
 http://losangeles.bizjournals.com/losangeles/stories/2008/03/24/daily22.html
 http://www.powermediagroup.com/pressfull3.html

Film production companies of the United States
Entertainment companies established in 1986
1986 establishments in California